Collen is a surname, and may refer to:

 Edwin Henry Hayter Collen (1843–1911), British Army officer in India
 Désiré Collen (born 1943), Belgian physician and chemist
 Henry Collen (1797–1879), portrait painter
 Lindsey Collen (born 1948), Mauritian novelist and activist
 Pieter Collen (born 1980), Belgian footballer
 Phil Collen (born 1957), English guitarist
 Tom Collen, basketball coach

See also
 Willink van Collenprijs (English: The Willink van Collen Award), Dutch art award named after Willink van Collen